Parliamentary elections were held in Transnistria on 29 November 2020, alongside municipal elections.

Electoral system 
The 33 seats of the Supreme Council are elected in single-member constituencies using first-past-the-post voting.

Campaign
Obnovlenie candidates ran unopposed in 22 of the 33 constituencies.

Results
Overall turnout was 27.79%, with the Camenca District reporting the highest turnout of 40.86%.

Obnovlenie won 29 out of 33 seats in the Supreme Council, maintaining their status as a majority government. Four independent politicians were also elected, all of whom are said to be close to the company Sheriff.

23,493 voted "against all" (20.6%).

References

Elections in Transnistria
Transnistria
Parliamentary
Election and referendum articles with incomplete results